Angel and Big Joe is a 1975 American short drama film directed by Bert Salzman and starring Paul Sorvino and Dadi Pinero. It won an Oscar at the 48th Academy Awards in 1976 for Best Short Subject.

Premise
Angel (Dadi Pinero) portrays a young migrant worker, while Big Joe (Paul Sorvino) is a telephone lineman. Angel feels that he can trust no one, but Big Joe sets out to prove him wrong.

Cast
 Paul Sorvino as Big Joe
 Dadi Pinero as Angel
 Gloria Irizarry as Mother
 Nicky Irizarry (also known as Dr. Nick Karapasas) as Nicky

References

External links

 on Internet Archive restored by Academic Film Archive

1975 films
1975 drama films
1975 short films
1975 independent films
American independent films
American drama short films
Films scored by Harry Manfredini
Live Action Short Film Academy Award winners
1970s English-language films
1970s American films